Gunawan Maryanto (10 April 1976 – 6 October 2021) was an Indonesian author and theatre director. He was born in Yogyakarta. Aside from managing Teater Garasi, he also organised the yearly Indonesian Dramatic Reading Festival with Joned Suryatmoko. His poetry, prose, and literary criticism have featured in a variety of Indonesian mass media.

Maryanto staged his works in several countries, received arts grants from the Manage Institute, and won a number of competitions. In 2017, Maryanto won the Best Lead Actor award at the Umar Ismail Awards for his performance as poet Widji Thukul in the film, Istirahatlah Kata-kata.

References

1976 births
2021 deaths
Citra Award winners
Maya Award winners
People from Yogyakarta